Bishop Greer can refer to the following:

David Hummell Greer (1844–1919), American Protestant Episcopal bishop
William Derrick Lindsay Greer (1902–1972), Anglican Bishop